Bois Blanc Island Airport is a public-use airport  northwest of the community of Bois Blanc Island, Michigan, United States. The airport is publicly owned by Bois Blanc Township.

The airport has one runway designated as 10/28. There is no fixed-base operator or fuel located at the airport.

The airport's runway was unpaved until 2005, at which time it was also extended.

For the 12-month period ending December 31, 2021, the airport had 67 operations per week, or about 3,500 per year. This was made up of 86% general aviation and 14% air taxi. For the same time period, there were two aircraft based at the airport, both single-engine airplanes.

References 

Airports in Michigan